is a Japanese politician of the Democratic Party of Japan, a member of the House of Councillors in the Diet (national legislature). A native of Takizawa, Iwate and graduate of Hokkaido University, he worked at the government of Iwate Prefecture from 1973 until 2003. He was elected to the House of Councillors for the first time in 2004.

After approximately 12 years in office, Shuhama cited the need to care for a seriously ill family member when he announced in April 2016 that he would not seek a third term at the July 2016 House of Councillors election.

References

External links 
 Official website in Japanese.

Members of the House of Councillors (Japan)
Living people
1950 births
Democratic Party of Japan politicians
Hokkaido University alumni
People's Life Party politicians